Sezgin is a common Turkish given name. In Turkish, "Sezgin" means "(someone) who is insightful" or "(someone) who is capable of intuition". The name is used as surname, as well.

Given name
 Sezgin Tanrıkulu (born 1963), Turkish lawyer and politician
 Sezgin Coşkun (born 1984), Turkish football player

Surname
 Adnan Sezgin (born 1954), Turkish football player
 Aydın Adnan Sezgin (born 1956), Turkish diplomat and politician
 Ayşe Sezgin (born 1958), Turkish diplomat 
 Fuat Sezgin (1924–2018), Turkish historian of Arabic-Islamic science
 İsmet Sezgin (1928–2016), Turkish politician
 Sezer Sezgin (born 1986), Turkish football player
 Bekir Sıtkı Sezgin (1936–1996), Turkish musician  
 Hayri Sezgin (born 1961), Turkish wrestler

See also 
 Sezer (disambiguation)

Turkish-language surnames
Turkish masculine given names